Korablinsky District is an administrative and municipal district (raion), one of the twenty-five in Ryazan Oblast, Russia. It is located in the southwestern central part of the oblast. Its administrative center is the town of Korablino. Population: 22,941 (2010 Census);  The population of Korablino accounts for 55.2% of the district's total population.

References

Notes

Sources

Districts of Ryazan Oblast